Büyükçağ is a village in the Genç District, Bingöl Province, Turkey. The village is populated by Kurds of the Botikan tribe and had a population of 68 in 2021.

The hamlets of Açıkalın, Aslancık, Gümüşlü, Kazancık, Köklü, Olgunlar, Üzümcük and Yuvalı are attached to the village.

References 

Villages in Genç District
Kurdish settlements in Bingöl Province